Jean Marguerite Caplin (21 February 1930 – 1 March 2014) was a British swimmer. She competed in the women's 200 metre breaststroke at the 1948 Summer Olympics.

References

External links
 

1930 births
2014 deaths
British female swimmers
Olympic swimmers of Great Britain
Swimmers at the 1948 Summer Olympics
Female breaststroke swimmers
20th-century British women